The Louise Log is an American web series created by Anne Flournoy. The Louise Log details the confessions of a New York City wife and mother hell-bent on getting it right in spite of her high-maintenance husband, her addiction to caffeine, an elaborate ensemble of notable characters and her over-active inner voice. The first episode aired on YouTube on the last day of 2007. Another forty-three episodes have since been released, and have been shown on YouTube, Koldcast, Vimeo and blip.tv. In the first two series Christine Cook starred as Louise; in the third series Morgan Hallett took over that role.

Cast and Characters 
 Christine Cook, as Louise (series 1&2)
 Morgan Hallett, as Louise (series 3)
 Mohammad Akmal, as Raj
 Talullah Mei Barni, as Liza
 Aidan Brogan, as Charles (series 1&2)
 Bruno Zero, as Charles (series 3)
 Snezhana Chernova, as Svetlana
 Senemi D’Almeida, as Cica
 Mathilde Dratwa, as Monique
 Kenneth B. Goldberg, as Phineas (series 1&2)
 Joe Franchini, as Phineas (series 3)
 Catherine Siracusa, as The Principal/Guidance Counsellor
 Jennifer Sklias-Gahan, as Ava
 Pascal Yen-Pfister, as Phineas
 Everett Quinton, as Ethelred
 Danusia Trevino, as Queen Elizabeth

Production 
The Louise Log was created by Sundance Film Festival veteran Anne Flournoy and produced by Micro-Movies LLC. Anne wrote the first seventeen episodes alone, but from episode 18-26 she was assisted by Sandra Vannucchi, and from episode 27-44 she was assisted by Mark Mordecai Green. Numerous people have been involved in the various aspects of making and distributing the series.

Critical reception 
The Louise Log won two awards at the 2014 LA Web Festival, Outstanding Writing in a Comedy (Anne Flournoy), and Lead Actress (Christine Cook, Seasons 1 & 2).

The Louise Log was shortlisted for the 2013 Web Show Shorty Awards.

The Independent, in its annual review of 10 Filmmakers to Watch, included Anne Flournoy for The Louise Log, and published an interview with her.

Digital Chick TV described The Louise Log as "a hilarious on-going comedy that gets into a woman’s mind. Literally.".

Good Day, Regular People said, "I very much relate to the heroine in this series, Louise. I do all the fumbling self doubt and second guessing of myself, as she does. My internal dialogue is much like hers--and to hear it voiced aloud, I laugh in recognition. And relief."

Funny Not Slutty said that The Louise Log is "a dark, funny, weird yet relatable web series about a woman, her life, her men, and her inner voice".

Episode Synopsis

See also
 10 Filmmakers to Watch in 2012 The Independent, Independent Media Publications
 An interview with Anne Flournoy, Adelaide Screenwriter
 How the Internet Revamped My Filmmaking Career, Internet Evolution
  Interview with Anne Flournoy, Times Square magazine
 Interview with Anne Flourney MidLife Bloggers

References

External links 
 The Louise Log Blip.tv
 The Louise Log Facebook
 The Louise Log IMDb
 The Louise Log Official website
 The Louise Log Twitter
 The Louise Log Web Series Channel
 The Louise Log YouTube

American comedy web series